Balbec may refer to:

Baalbek, Lebanon, known in antiquity as Heliopolis
Balbec, Indiana, a small town in the US
Balbec, France, a fictional town in Marcel Proust's In Search of Lost Time, modeled after Cabourg, France
Balbec, a clothing line by K'Maro